Finding Vivian Maier is a 2013 American documentary film about the photographer Vivian Maier, written, directed, and produced by John Maloof and Charlie Siskel, and executive produced by Jeff Garlin.

Maier was a French-American woman who worked most of her life as a nanny and housekeeper to a multitude of Chicago families. She carried a camera everywhere she went, but Maier's photographic legacy was largely unknown during her lifetime. She died in 2009.

The film documents how Maloof discovered her work and, after her death, uncovered her life through interviews with people who knew her. Maloof had purchased a box of photo negatives at a 2007 Chicago auction, then scanned the images and put them on the Internet.  News articles began to come out about Maier and a Kickstarter campaign for the documentary was soon underway.

The film had its world premiere at the 2013 Toronto International Film Festival on 9 September 2013. It was shown in cinemas, and was released on DVD in November 2014. Upon release, the film received critical acclaim, and won various awards, and was nominated for the Academy Award for Best Documentary Feature at the 87th Academy Awards.

Selected cast
 John Maloof
 Phil Donahue
 Mary Ellen Mark
 Joel Meyerowitz
 Tim Roth

Reception

Critical response
Finding Vivian Maier has an approval rating of 95% on review aggregator website Rotten Tomatoes, based on 100 reviews, and an average rating of 7.50/10. The website's critical consensus states, "Narratively gripping, visually striking, and ultimately thought-provoking, Finding Vivian Maier shines an overdue spotlight on its subject's long-hidden brilliance". It also has a score of 75 out of 100 on Metacritic, based on 27 critics, indicating "generally favorable reviews".

Accolades
 2014: Best Documentary Feature, Alaska Airlines Audience Award, Portland International Film Festival.
 2014: Best New Director Award, Alaska Airlines Audience Award, Portland International Film Festival.
 2014: Founders Prize for Best Documentary, Traverse City Film Festival.
 2014: Won (tied with The Overnighters by Jesse Moss) Grand Jury Prize, Knight Documentary Competition, Miami International Film Festival.
 2014: John Schlesinger Award for Outstanding First Feature, Palm Springs International Film Festival.
 2014:  Nominated for an Academy Award for Best Documentary Feature at the 87th Academy Awards.
 2014:  Nominated for Best Documentary Screenplay from the Writers Guild of America.

References

External links
 
 
 
 
 
 Maloof and Siskel interviewed by David Poland about Finding Vivian Maier (36 minute video)

2013 films
2010s biographical films
2013 documentary films
American biographical films
American documentary films
Documentary films about photographers
Documentary films about women
Films set in Chicago
Films shot in Chicago
Kickstarter-funded documentaries
2010s English-language films
2010s American films